William Robeyns (born 23 February 1996) is a Belgian-Rwandan basketball player who last played for Liège Basket of the BNXT League. He also represents the Rwanda national basketball team.

Professional career
Robeyns played for Phoenix Brussels from 2018 to 2021. During the 2020-21 season, he averaged 9.0 points, 1.7 rebounds, and 1.6 assists per game. On 20 May 2021, Robeyns signed with Liège Basket.

In the 2022 Belgian offseason, Robeyns played for APR of the Rwanda Basketball League.

National team career
In August 2021, Robeyn was added to the roster of the Rwanda national basketball team.

References

Living people
1996 births
APR B.C. players
Belgian men's basketball players
Brussels Basketball players
Donar (basketball club) players
Liège Basket players
People from Verviers
Rwandan men's basketball players
Small forwards
Spirou Charleroi players
Footballers from Liège Province